Map of What Is Effortless is the second studio album by Telefon Tel Aviv, an American electronic music duo consisting of Joshua Eustis and Charles Cooper. It was released on Hefty Records in 2004.

Critical reception

Ron Schepper of Stylus Magazine called the album "a marvelous fusion of electronica and soul." Michael Endelman of Entertainment Weekly said, "Loneliness, loss, and the darker side of soul music are the subjects of Telefon Tel Aviv's second album, a stunning collision of techno blips, lush strings, and swooning R&B vocals." Sam Samuelson of AllMusic commented that "TTA manage to not only make their first great album, but also put in the first entry for the best of 2004."

Track listing

Personnel
Credits adapted from liner notes.

Telefon Tel Aviv
 Joshua Eustis – lyrics (3), hammer (3), sound design, guitar, bass guitar, Nord keyboards, Rhodes piano, Wurlitzer piano, moog synthesizer, drums, claps, string arrangement, orchestra conducting, programming
 Charles Cooper – hammer (3), sound design, guitar, bass guitar, Nord keyboards, Rhodes piano, percussion, claps, snaps, orchestra recording, programming

Additional personnel
 Loyola University Chamber Orchestra – guest appearance (1, 2, 5, 7, 9)
 Damon Aaron – lyrics (2, 6, 9), vocals (2, 6, 9)
 Lindsay Anderson – vocals (3, 4, 8, 11), lyrics (4, 8)
 Kevin Duneman – drums (3, 6, 9)
 Turk Dietrich – impetus (5), wall (9)
 Fredo Nogueira – slide guitar (6), wall (9)
 Wendell Harrison – flute (6)
 Vahan Baladouni – orchestra recording assistance
 Brian Gardner – mastering

References

External links
 

2004 albums
Telefon Tel Aviv albums
Hefty Records albums